Héctor Manuel Rivera Pérez (May 15, 1933 – April 9, 2019) was an auxiliary bishop for the Roman Catholic Archdiocese of San Juan de Puerto Rico.

Life
Bishop Rivera Pérez obtained a Bachelor of Arts degree in theology in 1964 and earned a degree in social Sciences in the year 1969 in the Pontifical University of St. Thomas Aquinas, the Angelicum,  in Rome. Rivera Pérez was consecrated a bishop by John Paul II on August 17, 1979 and retired October 31, 2009.

See also
 

 Catholic Church hierarchy
 Catholic Church in the United States
 Historical list of the Catholic bishops of Puerto Rico
 Historical list of the Catholic bishops of the United States
 List of Catholic bishops of the United States
 Lists of patriarchs, archbishops, and bishops

References

External links
Roman Catholic Archdiocese of San Juan (Official Site in Spanish)

Episcopal succession

1933 births
2019 deaths
Bishops appointed by Pope John Paul II
People from Naranjito, Puerto Rico
Pontifical University of Saint Thomas Aquinas alumni
20th-century Roman Catholic bishops in Puerto Rico
20th-century Roman Catholic titular bishops
21st-century Roman Catholic bishops in Puerto Rico
Roman Catholic bishops of Puerto Rico